Dean Demopoulos (born March 29, 1954) is an American professional basketball coach. He currently serves as head coach for the Saskatchewan Rattlers of the Canadian Elite Basketball League (CEBL).

Early life
Demopoulos was born in Philadelphia, Pennsylvania, and graduated from West Chester State in 1977 with a degree in comprehensive social sciences. He began his coaching career at Kennett High School in Kennett Square, Pennsylvania.

College coaching career
In 1983, Demopoulos became an assistant to John Chaney at Temple University, a post he held until 2000. During that span, the Owls became a national basketball powerhouse, amassing a 393–151 (72.2%) record and making it to the NCAA Tournament 16 times and to the Elite Eight on four occasions.

For the 2000–01 college season, Demopoulos served as head coach of the Kansas City Roos men's basketball team. In his one season as coach, the Roos were ranked in the top 10 nationally in several statistical categories, including fewest turnovers (9.5 per game) and scoring defense (60.5 points per game).

Professional coaching career

NBA (2001–2012)
Between 2001 and 2005, Demopoulos served as an assistant to Nate McMillan at the Seattle SuperSonics in the NBA. With McMillan's move to the Portland Trail Blazers in 2005, Demopoulos joined him and again served as his lead assistant. After five seasons with the Trail Blazers, Demopoulos was hired as an assistant to Vinny Del Negro at the Los Angeles Clippers in 2010. He served under Del Negro for all three of his seasons, with Demopoulos leaving the Clippers in 2013.

Melbourne United (2015–2017)
In April 2015, Demopoulos was hired by Australian NBL club Melbourne United to be head coach on a two-year deal. He guided United to a 9–0 record to begin the 2015–16 season, which saw him set the best start to a debut head coaching season in league history. He was subsequently named NBL Coach of the Month for October 2015. Melbourne finished the regular season in first place with an 18–10 record, but went on to lose 2–0 to the fourth-seeded New Zealand Breakers in the semi-finals.

In 2016–17, Melbourne failed to make the finals despite boasting a bevy of stars. They entered the final round of the season in third place but lost both of their games, which saw them finish in sixth place with a 13–15 record. His contract was subsequently not renewed following the 2016–17 season.

Grand Rapids Drive (2018–2019)
Demopoulos spent the 2018–19 season as an assistant to Ryan Krueger at the Grand Rapids Drive of the NBA G League.

Saskatchewan Rattlers (2022–present) 
On January 19, 2022, Demopoulos was announced as the new head coach of the Saskatchewan Rattlers of the Canadian Elite Basketball League (CEBL).

References

1954 births
Living people
American men's basketball coaches
American expatriate basketball people in Australia
Basketball coaches from Pennsylvania
High school basketball coaches in the United States
Kansas City Roos men's basketball coaches
Los Angeles Clippers assistant coaches
Melbourne United coaches
National Basketball League (Australia) coaches
Portland Trail Blazers assistant coaches
Seattle SuperSonics assistant coaches
Sportspeople from Philadelphia
Temple Owls men's basketball coaches
West Chester University alumni